Alexander Buel (Sandy) Trowbridge III (December 12, 1929April 27, 2006) was an American politician and  businessman. He was the United States Secretary of Commerce from June 14, 1967, to March 1, 1968, in the administration of President Lyndon B. Johnson.

Biography
Trowbridge was born on December 12, 1929, at 01:05 pm in Englewood, New Jersey. He was the son of American University Professor of Russian History Alexander Buel Trowbridge Jr., and the grandson of Alexander Buel Trowbridge, the former dean of the Cornell University College of the Architecture (1897–1902). His grandmother Gertrude Mary Sherman was the great-great-granddaughter of American founding father Roger Sherman. His mother, the former Julie Chamberlain, who was the executive director of the Woodrow Wilson Foundation from 1942 to 1961. Trowbridge's parents divorced, and he was raised by his mother.

As a young man, Trowbridge attended Phillips Academy in Andover, Massachusetts, in 1947, before graduating with an A.B. from the Woodrow Wilson School of Public and International Affairs at Princeton University in 1951 after completing a senior thesis titled "The Spanish Loan. A Case Study of Executive-Congressional Relations in the Formulation and Control of American Foreign Policy." After World War II, he worked with various reconstruction efforts. After working with the International Intern Program of the United Nations in Lake Success, New York, he served in the Korean War in the Marine Corps.

Between 1954 and 1965, he was an oil businessman. In 1965, President Lyndon B. Johnson appointed him to serve as the Assistant Secretary of Commerce. On January 19, 1967, he became acting Secretary of Commerce, and in June of that year he became U.S. Secretary of Commerce, a position he served in until March 1, 1968. He resigned to return to business, serving first as the President of the American Management Association, in May 1968, before the joining Allied Chemical as a Vice-Chairman of the Morristown, NJ-based parent company and the Chairman of their Canadian subsidiary, Allied Chemical Canada Ltd. of Pointe-Claire (QC).

He later served as head of the National Association of Manufacturers from 1980 until 1989. In the early 1990s, he served as a member of the Competitiveness Policy Council.

As Secretary of Commerce, he proposed to re-merge of the Department of Commerce and the Department of Labor.

Trowbridge died in Washington, D.C., on April 27, 2006, at the age of 76, after suffering from Lewy body dementia. He is buried at the Arlington National Cemetery in Arlington, Virginia.

References

External links
Arlington National Cemetery
Phillips Andover Obit
A.Buel Trowbridge, Professor At American University, Is Dead
American President: Alexander B. Trowbridge (1967 - 1968)
The College of Architecture: A True Art Sentiment

1929 births
2006 deaths
People from Englewood, New Jersey
Military personnel from New Jersey
Princeton University alumni
United States Secretaries of Commerce
Lyndon B. Johnson administration cabinet members
20th-century American politicians
Presidents of the American Management Association